Neonesthes is a genus of barbeled dragonfish.

Species
There are currently two recognized species in this genus:
 Neonesthes capensis (Gilchrist & von Bonde, 1924) (Cape snaggletooth)
 Neonesthes microcephalus Norman, 1930 (Smallhead snaggletooth)

References

Stomiidae
Marine fish genera
Ray-finned fish genera
Taxa named by Charles Tate Regan
Taxa named by Ethelwynn Trewavas